Atheha is a Town in Lalganj tehsil, Pratapgarh district of Indian state Uttar Pradesh.

Geography

Notable Person 
 Deenanath Sewak (Ex. M.L.A. and Ex. Minister, Government of Uttar Pradesh)

References

Cities and towns in Pratapgarh district, Uttar Pradesh